Vitalis "Digital" Takawira (born September 24, 1972 in Salisbury) is a retired Zimbabwean football player. He has played forward and attacking midfield professionally in Zimbabwe, Switzerland and the United States, as well as for the Zimbabwe national team.

Career
He came to prominence in Zimbabwe while playing for popular Harare outfit, Dynamos, where he was top goal scorer for five seasons. Takawira was the top scorer in the Zimbabwean First Division three times and won the African Golden Boot in 1994. He signed with Major League Soccer in 1996, and was allocated to Kansas City Wiz (later Wizards). Takawira spent the next four years with Kansas City, playing 110 times, with 29 goals scored and 19 assists in the league. After goals, he would often celebrate with the Digital Crawl, where he would get down and walk on all fours as teammates joined in.

After leaving MLS, Takawira moved down to the A-League, where he played for Milwaukee Rampage and Milwaukee Wave United. He was named A-League MVP in 2000 and helped Rampage to the league title in 2002.

For Zimbabwe, Takawira played from 1992–1999, and scored 12 goals in 26 appearances.

References

1972 births
Living people
Sportspeople from Harare
Zimbabwean footballers
Zimbabwean expatriate footballers
Zimbabwe international footballers
Sporting Kansas City players
USL First Division players
Milwaukee Rampage players
Milwaukee Wave United players
Dynamos F.C. players
Major League Soccer players
Major League Soccer All-Stars
Zimbabwean expatriate sportspeople in the United States
Association football forwards